Rômulo Rafael da Silva (born 24 June 1993), simply known as Rômulo, is a Brazilian footballer who plays for Bento Gonçalves as a left back.

External links

Rômulo at ZeroZero

1993 births
Living people
Footballers from São Paulo
Brazilian footballers
Brazilian expatriate footballers
Association football defenders
Campeonato Brasileiro Série A players
Campeonato Brasileiro Série B players
Campeonato Brasileiro Série D players
Paraguayan Primera División players
Criciúma Esporte Clube players
Clube Atlético Penapolense players
Associação Portuguesa de Desportos players
Itumbiara Esporte Clube players
Uberaba Sport Club players
Deportivo Capiatá players
Sampaio Corrêa Futebol Clube players
Esporte Clube Pelotas players
Guarani de Palhoça players
Clube Esportivo Bento Gonçalves players
Brazilian expatriate sportspeople in Paraguay
Expatriate footballers in Paraguay